Axel Johannes Malmquist (19 October 1882, in Hammars parish, Örebro county – 24 February 1952, in Solna) was a Swedish mathematician working in the area of ordinary differential equations.

He studied in the University of Stockholm in 1900-1907 and obtained PhD in Stockholm  in 1909.
He worked in the university of Stockholm in 1903-1913, and then became a professor in the Stockholm  Institute of Technology.

His most famous results are Malmquist theorems on first order algebraic differential equations,
and discovery of Hamiltonian structure of Painlevé equations.

References

External links
A. Johannes Malmquist (in Swedish)

1882 births
1952 deaths
20th-century Swedish mathematicians
People from Askersund Municipality
Stockholm University alumni
Academic staff of Stockholm University